Haifa Airport (Namal HaTe'ufa Haifa) , also known as U Michaeli Airport is a small international airport located in Haifa, Israel. It is located to the east of the city, close to Kishon Port and Israel Shipyards and mainly serves civilian flights, with some military usage. Most passenger flights utilizing the airport are domestic operations to Eilat and Tel Aviv. The airport is named after Uri Michaeli, one of the pioneers of Jewish aviation and one of the founders of aviation in Israel.

History

Haifa Airport was established by the British Mandate in 1934 as its first international airport at the location of RAF Station Haifa which originally served the British Army and the Iraqi-British oil company, APS. RAF Haifa already had passenger service by Imperial Airways to Alexandria (since 1931) and Baghdad (since 1932). In 1936 passenger services by Misr Airwork to Beirut and Cyprus were opened. In 1937, these were joined by Palestine Airways services, as well as Ala Littoria regular services to Brindisi and Trieste via Athens. In 1938 a third of flights into Mandatory Palestine landed in Haifa; but in 1940, civil flights were stopped due to the Second World War in which the airport served the Royal Air Force's operations in the Middle East as RAF Haifa. The RAF station closed in 1948, and the airport re-opened as Haifa Airport.

RAF Haifa
RAF Haifa was a Royal Air Force station in Mandatory Palestine between 1918 and 1948.

Operational units at RAF Haifa 1938 to 1948:
No. 6 Squadron RAF detachment (1938–1939) Hawker Hardy
No. 30 Squadron RAF detachment (1940) Bristol Blenheim
No. 80 Squadron RAF (1941) Hawker Hurricane I
No. 112 Squadron RAF detachment (1941) Curtiss Tomahawk I
No. 142 Squadron RAF detachment (1918) Royal Aircraft Factory B.E.2
No. 144 Squadron RAF detachment (1919) de Havilland DH.9
No. 208 Squadron RAF detachment (1941) Hawker Audax
No. 213 Squadron RAF (1941) Hawker Hurricane I
No. 260 Squadron RAF (1941) Hawker Hurricane I
No. 261 Squadron RAF (1942) Hawker Hurricane I
No. 450 Squadron RAAF (1941) Hawker Hurricane I
No. 651 Squadron RAF (1948) Auster AOP6

Haifa Airport post-1948
The airport reopened for passenger traffic in 1948 with flights operated by Cyprus Airways. This was followed ten years later by Arkia Israel Airlines flights. It wasn't until 1994, however, that the airport received international status, and at this time, it was planned that the airport would serve flights to destinations across Europe. Less than a year later, the airport was placed for sale. At this time, great interest in the site was shown by the French construction group, Bouygues, as well as British Aerospace.

These expected services never really took off however, and it wasn't until 1996, and the start of Israir flights, that the airport grew. This growth was further increased in 1998 with Aeroel service. Royal Wings increased route offerings once again with flights from Jordan, whilst Scorpio started flights to Egypt. In 1998, a new terminal was opened at the airport to cater for all of the services needed in a modern international airport. In the past there were three takeoff and landing runways in the airport, of which only two still exist, and only one is currently in use.

In 2001, talk over expanding the airport restarted when then Finance Minister, Silvan Shalom called for an 800 million NIS upgrade to turn the airport into one of an international standard.

2007 saw the first rise in passenger numbers and aircraft movements since 2002 with an increase of 25% in passenger numbers and a 7% increase in aircraft movements over the previous year. In general, between the peak point of its operation in 1999 and 2007 passenger number have fallen by 50%. Aircraft movements have decreased from 2002 to 2007 by 34%.

Future
The Israel Airports Authority intends to extend the runway to  sometime in the 2020s. This will involve extending the runway northwards, across Julius Simon Road, which will then pass in a tunnel underneath the runway.

Airlines and destinations

Statistics

See also
 List of former Royal Air Force stations

References

Citations

Bibliography

 Jefford, C.G. RAF Squadrons, a Comprehensive Record of the Movement and Equipment of all RAF Squadrons and their Antecedents since 1912. Shrewsbury, Shropshire, UK: Airlife Publishing, 2001. .
 Sturtivant, Ray, ISO and John Hamlin. RAF Flying Training And Support Units since 1912. Tonbridge, Kent, UK: Air-Britain (Historians) Ltd., 2007. .

External links 

 
 
 Haifa Airport aviation weather 

Airports in Israel
Airport
Airports established in 1934
1934 establishments in Mandatory Palestine